"Soft Summer Breeze" is a song written and performed by Eddie Heywood.  It reached No. 11 on the U.S. pop chart in 1956.  The song was featured on his 1955 album, Eddie Heywood.

Other charting versions
The Diamonds released a version of the song as a single which reached No. 34 on the U.S. pop chart in 1956.  Lyrics were added to the song by Judy Spencer.

Other versions
Earl Grant featuring Van Alexander an His Orchestra released a version of the song on a 1956 EP.
Ken Mackintosh and His Orchestra released a version of the song as the B-side to his 1956 single "Highway Patrol".
Dick Hyman released a version of the song on his 1962 album, Provocative Piano, Vol. 2.
The Jonah Jones Quartet released a version of the song on his 1961 album, Great Instrumental Hits Styled by Jonah Jones.
Jimmy Forrest released a version of the song as the B-side to his 1962 single "Theme from Experiment in Terror".  It was featured on his album Soul Street.
Gene Ammons released a version of the song on his 1963 album, Boss Soul!
Julie London released a version of the song on her 1963 album, The Wonderful World of Julie London.
The Carol Lou Trio released a version of the song as a single as part of a medley with "Canadian Sunset" in 1969, but it did not chart.
Steve Khan released a version of the song on his 1977 album, Tightrope.
Winifred Atwell released a version of the song on her 2003 compilation album, Hall of Fame/Rhapsody in Blue.

References

1955 songs
1956 singles
1969 singles
The Diamonds songs
Mercury Records singles
Songs with music by Eddie Heywood Jr.